Forsheda is a locality situated in Värnamo Municipality, Jönköping County, Sweden with 1,459 inhabitants in 2010.

Notable people
John Ljunggren - Olympic race walker

References 

Populated places in Jönköping County
Populated places in Värnamo Municipality
Finnveden